Ben Ami is an agricultural settlement in the Northern District of Israel. Located next to Nahariya, it falls under the jurisdiction of Mateh Asher Regional Council.

History
The moshav was founded in 1949 by demobilized soldiers on lands  which had belonged to the depopulated Palestinian villages  of al-Nahr and  Umm al-Faraj. 

Ben Ami was one of settlements hit by Katyusha rockets sent by Hezbollah on 14 July 2006 during the 2006 Lebanon War.

References

Populated places in Northern District (Israel)
Moshavim
Populated places established in 1949
1949 establishments in Israel